Atletismo Sudamericano (South American Athletics), formerly CONSUDATLE (Spanish: Confederación Sudamericana de Atletismo; South American Athletics Confederation), is the continental confederation governing body of athletics for national governing bodies and multi-national federations within South America. CONSUDATLE is one of six area associations of World Athletics (WA). CONSUDATLE was founded on May 24, 1918, in Buenos Aires, Argentina.  Therefore, the CONSUDATLE claims to be the oldest athletics area association of the world. The founding members were Argentina, Uruguay, and Andean Chile. Successively, the other countries joined: Brazil in 1922, Ecuador and Peru in 1925, Bolivia in 1930, and Colombia in 1937. Paraguay and Venezuela followed later, and Guyana, Panama, and Suriname joined within the last decades.

Presidents
The current president Roberto Gesta de Melo was re-elected in 2010 for the period 2011-2015 in Rio de Janeiro.  Former presidents can be found here.

Championships

The ConSudAtle organizes the following championships, tournaments, and circuits:

South American Senior Championships in Athletics (Campeonatos Sudamericanos de Atletismo de Adultos)
South American Under-23 Championships (Campeonatos Sudamericanos de Atletismo de Sub-23)
South American Junior (Under-20) Championships (Campeonatos Sudamericanos de Atletismo de Juveniles)
South American Youth (Under-18) Championships (Campeonatos Sudamericanos de Atletismo de Menores)
South American Age Group (Under-16) Championships (Campeonatos Sudamericanos de Atletismo Infantil)
South American Cross Country Championships (Campeonatos Sudamericanos de Atletismo de Cross Country)
South American Race Walking Championships (Campeonatos Sudamericanos de Atletismo de Marcha Atlética)
South American Marathon Championships (Campeonatos Sudamericanos de Atletismo de Maratón)
South American Half Marathon Championships (Campeonatos Sudamericanos de Atletismo de Media Maratón)
South American Half Marathon Circuit (Circuito Sudamericano de Media Maratón)
South American Road Mile Championships (Campeonatos Sudamericanos de Milla en Ruta) 
South American Mountain Running Championships (Campeonatos Sudamericanos de Carreras de Montaña)

Member federations

See also

Association of Panamerican Athletics (APA)
Central American and Caribbean Athletic Confederation (CACAC)
Central American Isthmus Athletic Confederation (CADICA)
North American, Central American and Caribbean Athletic Association (NACAC)

References

External links
Official website

Athletics in South America
Athletics organizations
Sports governing bodies in South America
1918 establishments in South America
Sports organizations established in 1918